The World Junior-B Curling Championships are an annual curling bonspiel. The championships feature curlers under the age of 21 competing to qualify for three spots in the World Junior Curling Championships. Nations that participate are those which have not already qualified for the World Junior Championships. The competition originally was established in 1999, then was replaced after the 2003-04 season with the European Junior Curling Challenge and Pacific-Asia Junior Curling Championships. In 2016, the Junior-B Championships were brought back to replace the European and Pacific-Asia Junior Championships.

The 2021 World Junior-B Championships were scheduled to be held in Lohja, Finland, but in September 2020 the World Curling Federation announced they would be cancelled due to the ongoing COVID-19 pandemic.

Summary
Skips of each winning team are listed below their corresponding nation

Men

Women

Notes

References